The Principality of Alšėnai () was a feudal patrimony of the Alšėniškiai in the late 13th and mid-16th centuries.

History 
Maciej Stryjkowski also relates the origins of the Alšėniškiai family to Alšis Romuntavičius, coming from the line of Dausprungas. 

The princes of Alšėnai held high positions in the Lithuanian state for a long time. In 1440 and 1492, meetings were held in Alšėnai to determine the candidates for the Grand Ducal throne. In the middle of the 16th century, the ancestral possession of the Alšėniškiai passed to the Sapiega family.

Geography 
The principality's center was Alšėnai (now Halshany) and it was the territory between the rivers Vilija and Nemunas. In the 15th century, the principality stretched from north to south - from Vilkmergė (now Ukmergė) and Pastavy to Hlusk and Turov, from east to west - from Minsk to Masty.

References

Sources 

 
 
 
 
 
16th-century disestablishments
13th-century establishments
Olshanski family